AMPS, Amps may refer to:

Amps
 Abbreviation of the plural for ampere, a unit of electric current
 Abbreviation of the plural for amplifier, a circuit or device that amplifies electrical signals
 The Amps, an American rock band
 Advanced Mobile Phone System

AMPS
 2-Acrylamido-2-methylpropane sulfonic acid, an acidic monomer
 Advanced Mobile Phone System, a mobile phone systems technology
 Advanced Modular Processing System, the original implementation of flow-based programming
 Amplified musculoskeletal pain syndromes, in which excessive, acute and chronic pain are observed for which no overt primary cause can be found or surmised
 The Assessment of Motor and Process  (AMPS) developed by Fisher (1999), is an outcome measure used to evaluate the quality of motor and process skills necessary for effective engagement in activity of daily living (ADL) tasks (Sellers, Fisher, & Duran, 2001).
 Armor Modeling and Preservation Society, an international hobby club based in the United States
 Association Medicine / Pharmacy Sciences, a French association of students enrolled in PharmD/PhD or MD/PhD curriculum
 Association of Motion Picture Sound, a UK association of film and television sound professionals
 AMPS firewall, a black hole firewall proposed in 2012 by Ahmed Almheiri, Donald Marolf, Joseph Polchinski, and James Sully

See also

 ampere-second (As), the coulomb (C); amp-sec
 Amp (disambiguation)
 Amped (disambiguation)
 Ampere (disambiguation)